Compilers: Principles, Techniques, and Tools is a computer science textbook by Alfred V. Aho, Monica S. Lam, Ravi Sethi, and Jeffrey D. Ullman about compiler construction for programming languages. First published in 1986, it is widely regarded as the classic definitive compiler technology text.

It is known as the Dragon Book to generations of computer scientists as its cover depicts a knight and a dragon in battle, a metaphor for conquering complexity. This name can also refer to Aho and Ullman's older Principles of Compiler Design.

First edition
The first edition (1986) is informally called the "red dragon book" to distinguish it from the second edition  and from Aho & Ullman's 1977 Principles of Compiler Design sometimes known as the "green dragon book".
Topics covered in the first edition include:
Compiler structure
Lexical analysis (including regular expressions and finite automata)
Syntax analysis (including context-free grammars, LL parsers, bottom-up parsers, and LR parsers)
Syntax-directed translation
Type checking (including type conversions and polymorphism)
Run-time environment (including parameter passing, symbol tables and register allocation)
Code generation (including intermediate code generation)
Code optimization

Second edition
Following in the tradition of its two predecessors, the second edition (2006) features a dragon and a knight on its cover, and is informally known as the purple dragon. Monica S. Lam of Stanford University became a co-author with this edition.

The second edition includes several additional topics, including:
 Directed translation
 New data flow analyses
 Parallel machines
 Garbage collection
 New case studies

See also
Structure and Interpretation of Computer Programs

References

Further reading

External links
 Book Website at Stanford with link to Errata

1986 books
2006 non-fiction books
Compiler construction
Computer science books
Engineering textbooks
Compiler theory